Angus Gill is an Australian singer-songwriter, comedian and producer from Wauchope in New South Wales. Gill is a Golden Guitar winner and an Australian Independent Country Music Award winner. He has had eight #1 songs on the Australian country music radio charts. In November 2019, Gill became one of the youngest Australian artists to perform on the Grand Ole Opry in Nashville, Tennessee.

Biography

Early years
Angus grew up in Wauchope on the Mid North Coast of New South Wales. He first picked up the guitar at age 6 and played his first gig at his local country music club, the Hastings Country Music Association, at age 7. Gill attended Wauchope Public School, where he formed his own band, Angus Gill and the Wild Turkeys, later attending St Columba Anglican School in Port Macquarie. Whilst in school, Gill honed his craft by playing regular gigs at the Wauchope's heritage theme park Timbertown and hosting his own radio show on Wauchope based community radio station 2WAY FM. Gill received a scholarship to attend the CMAA Academy of Country Music in Tamworth in 2012 and released his debut EP Livewire in 2014.

2017–present
Gill released his self-produced debut album Nomad on 15 September 2017 via Checked Label Services. The album features collaborations with Adam Harvey, Gina Jeffreys, Kevin Bennett, Luke O'Shea, Bill Chambers, Drew McAlister, Troy Kemp, Mike Carr, Amos Morris and others.

In 2019, Gill signed a global publishing deal with Origin Music Publishing. He released his second studio album Welcome to My Heart in September 2019, which debuted at number 2 on the ARIA Country Albums Chart. The album was nominated for 'Traditional Country Album of the Year' at the 48th Country Music Awards of Australia.

In 2020, Gill collaborated with the members of the Paul Kelly band for his third studio album 3 Minute Movies, released as Angus Gill & Seasons of Change, in September 2020 on Rivershack Records/MGM. The album features a duet with US singer-songwriter Steve Earle and a guest appearance from Mark Lizotte. 3 Minute Movies reached number 1 on the AIR Albums Chart, number 2 on the ARIA Australian Country Albums Chart and number 28 on the ARIA Top 50 Albums Chart. Gill and Seasons of Change were nominated for two Golden Guitar awards at the 49th Country Music Awards of Australia.

In October 2021, Gill released The Scrapbook which became his highest ARIA chart peak, debuting at number 1 on the ARIA Australian Country Albums Chart and number 19 on the ARIA Top 50 Albums Chart. Gill was nominated for four Golden Guitar awards at the 50th Country Music Awards of Australia, winning one for Bush Ballad of the Year for The Easy Way. In 2022, Gill had three #1 hits on the Country Songs Top 40 Australian Airplay Chart in six weeks, as a songwriter and producer.

Discography

Albums

Extended plays

Awards

CMA Awards
The Country Music Awards of Australia is an annual awards night held in January during the Tamworth Country Music Festival, celebrating recording excellence in the Australian country music industry.
 (wins only)
|-
| 2022 || "The Easy Way" (with Manfred Vijars) || Bush Ballad of the Year || 
|-

Australian Independent Country Music Awards
The Australian Independent Country Music Awards recognises the achievements of independent recording artists. The prestigious awards commenced in 1996.
 (wins only)
|-
| 2018
| "Hands Are Clean"
| Male Rising Star
| 
|-

Tamworth Songwriters Awards
The Tamworth Songwriters Association (TSA) is an annual songwriting awards night for original country songs, awarded in January at the Tamworth Country Music Festival. They commenced in 1986.
 (wins only)
|-
| 2013
| "Names Upon the Wall"
| Junior Songwriter
| 
|-

References 

Living people
1998 births
Australian country singer-songwriters
Australian country singers
Musicians from New South Wales
21st-century Australian male singers
21st-century Australian singers
Australian male singer-songwriters